Cheumatopsyche ela is a species of netspinning caddisfly in the family Hydropsychidae.  It is found in North America.

References

Further reading

 
 
 
 

Trichoptera